Pirie Street is a road on the east side of the Adelaide city centre, South Australia.  It runs east–west, between East Terrace and King William Street. After crossing King William Street, it continues as Waymouth Street. It forms the southern boundary of Hindmarsh Square which is in the centre of the north-east quadrant of the city centre.

Pirie Street is served by a stop on the Glenelg tram line on King William Street. It is mainly occupied by office buildings, restaurants, and nightspots.

It has a number of notable buildings, including several heritage-listed ones, and was once home to the biggest brewery in the colony of South Australia, the Adelaide Brewery. In 2019 it was used as a location for the film Escape from Pretoria, starring Daniel Radcliffe, substituting for Cape Town, South Africa.

History and notable buildings

Pirie Street was named after Sir John Pirie, Lord Mayor of London and a founding director of the South Australian Company.

The Pirie Street Methodist Church was located on the site that is now the Adelaide Town Hall office building, with the 1862 Methodist Meeting Hall (see below) behind.

The Adelaide City Council headquarters are on Pirie Street.

The Pirie Street Brewery, later known as Adelaide Brewery, occupied a number of buildings down Wyatt Street, as well as the building currently at no. 113, occupied by the Hill Smith Gallery. While this building has not as yet been heritage-listed, the other brewery buildings in Wyatt street are on the South Australian Heritage Register.

Other buildings which are heritage-listed as of local heritage interest  are:
The Epworth Building at 31-35 Pirie Street was built in 1926 as a commercial property for the Methodist Church. Designed by the architectural practice of English and Soward, it is listed among 120 nationally significant 20th-century buildings in South Australia.
a 1920s façade of the former Bank of South Australia at no. 51; however, in August 2020, developers were given permission to demolish the whole building ahead of the construction of a new Hyatt Regency Adelaide Hotel,
the old Tivoli Hotel at no.248;

Buildings which are heritage-listed at state level  are:
the Queen's Chambers at no. 19;
the Old Methodist Meeting Hall at no. 25; and
Darlington House offices, formerly the Salvation Army's People's Palace, where Archie Roach met Ruby Hunter), and before that the original German Club building (1879).

Film location
In March 2019 a section of Pirie Street was closed for the day and transformed to represent Cape Town in the 1970s, for filming of the thriller film Escape from Pretoria, starring Daniel Radcliffe.

Junction list

See also

References

Streets in Adelaide